The Buick 4 was a series of passenger cars produced by the Buick Division of GM from 1909 through 1918, and was available as a touring car, phaeton or roadster. It was available with the Buick Model B as a larger alternative offering a larger engine and better durability. It became the junior sedan in 1914 when the Buick Six was introduced.

History
The Model 10 (1908–1910) was equipped with a overhead valve, in-line  four-cylinder engine developing 40 bhp. The engine was installed in the front, driving the rear wheels through a transmission shaft. The gearbox had three forward gears, with the gearshift lever positioned to the right of the driver. The brake pedal came into contact with the Drum brake on the rear wheels.
The Model 10 was an improvement of the previously developed car made by Janney Motor Company and acquired by Buick. The Model 32 (roadster) and Model 33 (touring car) were built in 1911. It had a listed retail price of US$1,000 ($ in  dollars ).

The model designations changed again for 1914, now identified as the B-24 roadster and B-25 Touring sedan, with 3,126 B-24 roadsters and 13,446 B-25 assembled, while the dimensions and mechanical features unchanged, aside from a standard folding windshield.

For 1915, the roadster was the C-24 and the touring sedan was the C-25, manufacturing stayed the same while 3,256 C-24 roadsters and 19,080 C-25 touring cars were built.

The Buick Four series was discontinued in 1918. The next Buick offering with a four-cylinder engine was the 1980 Buick Skylark, which had a four-cylinder engine as an option.

References

See also
List of Buick vehicles
Cadillac Model Thirty
Oldsmobile Series 22
Oakland

Model 10
Veteran vehicles
1900s cars